Su Gavabor (also Romanized as Sū Gavābor) is a village in Rahimabad Rural District, Rahimabad District, Rudsar County, Gilan Province, Iran. At the 2006 census, its population was 171, in 46 families.

References 

Populated places in Rudsar County